Ishita Chauhan is an Indian actress and model. She debuted as a child in the Hindi film Aap Kaa Surroor in 2007. She also acted in Hijack (2008). She made her Bollywood debut in Anil Sharma's Genius as Nandini Chauhan opposite to Utkarsh Sharma which released on 24 August 2018. The music of the film is composed by Himesh Reshammiya, "Tera Fitoor" and "Dil Meri Na Sune" two of the most hits song of 2018.

Career

Ishita started her career in Aap Kaa Surroor and Hijack. As a child artist, she also acted in many TV commercials - Fortune Cooking Oil, Vaseline, Chandrika Soap, Dettol Liquid Handwash, Aacron Colours, Kinetic Nova, Colgate, Medimix Soap, Medicare Shampoo, Rejoice Shampoo, Nestle are a few advertisements to name. She was a brand ambassador for girl's clothing brand named Peppermint. After her studies she returned to acting in the hit Asha Black. Ishita made her Bollywood Debut in Anil Sharma's Genius, opposite Utkarsh Sharma, released on 24 August 2018. Her performance was applauded, but the film received generally poor reviews due to the confusing narrative. However, the movie did wonders on ZEE5. The “Brain Olympics” scene from the movie often goes viral on Social Media.

Filmography

Music video

References

External links

Living people
Indian film actresses
1999 births
Actresses in Malayalam cinema
Actresses in Hindi cinema